Maikol Benassi (born 26 November 1989) is an Italian footballer who plays as a centre-back for  club Livorno.

Club career

Viareggio
Born in Viareggio, the Province of Lucca, Benassi started his career at Lucca team Lucchese. After the team was expelled from professional league, he was signed by Serie B team Empoli, but farmed to Lega Pro Seconda Divisione side Viareggio in a co-ownership deal, rejoining Lucchese team-mate Leonardo Massoni and Luca Ruglioni. In the first season he only played 9 times. He followed the team promoted to Lega Pro Prima Divisione as some teams were expelled from professional league, thus Viareggio was selected to fill the vacancies. He became a regular starter that season, replacing departed Massoni, and also played both legs of relegation play-offs, partnered with Lorenzo Fiale. On 24 June 2010 Viareggio bought the remain 50% registration rights from Empoli.

Carrarese
After Viareggio re-signed Massoni as well as other defenders on a temporary basis, Benassi was sold to Lega Pro Seconda Divisione side Carrarese in another co-ownership deal. He just missed once for Carrarese, which he was suspended in round 29 for his fourth caution. He also played the first two rounds of the league for Viareggio and once in the cup. He also played all 4 promotion play-offs, partnering Fabrizio Anzalone and scored once in the last match. On 18 June 2011 Carrarese bought the remain 50% registration rights from Viareggio.

Romagna Centro Cesena
On 4 August 2018, Benassi joined Romagna Centro Cesena in Serie D.

Lucchese
On 4 September 2019, he returned to his youth club Lucchese, now in Serie D.

Pistoiese
On 12 July 2022, he moved to Pistoiese on Serie D.

Return to Livorno
On 14 December 2022, Benassi returned to Livorno.

International career
He has been capped for the Italy U-20 Lega Pro team in the 2008–09 Mirop Cup and in 2009–11 International Challenge Trophy

References

External links
 Football.it Profile 
  
 2009–10 Viareggio Profile 
 
 

1989 births
Living people
People from Viareggio
Sportspeople from the Province of Lucca
Footballers from Tuscany
Italian footballers
Association football central defenders
Serie C players
Serie D players
S.S.D. Lucchese 1905 players
F.C. Esperia Viareggio players
Carrarese Calcio players
A.S.D. Victor San Marino players
Parma Calcio 1913 players
U.S. Livorno 1915 players
Fermana F.C. players
S.S. Monopoli 1966 players
Cesena F.C. players
Novara F.C. players
U.S. Pistoiese 1921 players